(born January 13, 1958) is a Japanese composer.

Biography
Yasuraoka was born in Tokyo and studied with composers Teruyuki Noda (野田暉行) and Akira Miyoshi graduating Tokyo University of the Arts in 1984 with a master's degree in music composition.  He has received several awards and distinctions including the 1st Prize in Composition at the Music Competition of Japan (日本音楽コンクール) in 1980 and the 1982 Japan Symphony Foundation Composition Award for his Symphony.  He was recipient of the 1994 Kenzo Nakajima Music Award (中島健蔵音楽賞).

In 1985, Yasuraoka organized Art Respirant, a chamber orchestra of young performing artists and composers.

Currently Yasuraoka is professor at Toho Gakuen School of Music and Tokyo University of the Arts.  He is a member of the 21st Century Music Association (21世紀音楽の会) and a director of the Japan Society for Contemporary Music (日本現代音楽協会).

Selected works 
The works of Yasuraoka are published by the Japan Federation of Composers, Zen-On Music, Ongaku-no-tomo Sha and Tokyo Academia Music.
Orchestra
 Symphony (1982)

Concertante
 Métamorphose concertante (協奏的変容) for Violin, Cello and Orchestra (1991)
 Concerto Grosso No.1 "Animatori" (1993)
  for Viola and Orchestra (1995–1996)
 Antiphon for 25 Solo Strings (1996)

Chamber music
 Capriccio for Clarinet, Cello and Piano (1980)
 Projection for Violin and Piano (1984)
 Offrande (オフランド, Offering) for Viola Solo (1990)
  for Solo Percussion (1992)
 Aria for Violin Solo (1992)
 Melodia (メロディア) for 4 Flutes (1993)
 Passaggio, Concertino for Marimba and 9 Instruments (1997)
  for Harp Solo (2000)
 Aria Scomposta for Violin and Piano (2005)

Vocal
 Discantus (ディスカントゥス), Vocalise for Soprano, Violin, Cello and Piano (1994)

External links 
 Akio Yasuraoka profile at Tokyo University of the Arts 
 Art Respirant

References 

1958 births
20th-century classical composers
20th-century Japanese musicians
21st-century classical composers
21st-century Japanese musicians
Academic staff of Toho Gakuen School of Music
Japanese classical composers
Japanese male classical composers
Living people
Tokyo University of the Arts alumni
20th-century Japanese male musicians
21st-century Japanese male musicians